The 2012–13 Melbourne Aces season will be the third season for the team. As was the case for the previous season, the Aces will compete in the Australian Baseball League (ABL) with the other five foundation teams, and for the first time, the team will play its home games at the Melbourne Ballpark.

Offseason 
During the offseason, the Aces announced that they were moving their home games from the Royal Melbourne Showgrounds to the Melbourne Ballpark in Altona, Victoria. The Ballpark, which also hosted Melbourne-based teams in the previous incarnation of the league, will undergo significant improvements before the opening of the season, including the adjustment of fences, and the installation of an open-air beer garden.

Regular season

Standings

Record vs opponents

Game log 

|- bgcolor=#bbffbb
| 1
| 9 November
| 
| 5–1
| J. Hussey
| R. Olsen
| 
| 1,116 
| 1-0
| 
|- bgcolor=#ffbbbb
| 2
| 10 November
| 
| 0–4
| Z. Fuesser
| H. Koishi
| 
| 1,228
| 1-1
| 
|- bgcolor=#bbffbb
| 3
| 11 November
| 
| 7–2
| S. Gibbons
| P. Mildren
| 
| 296
| 2-1
| 
|- bgcolor=#ffbbbb
| 4
| 16 November
| @ 
| 0–3
| V. Vasquez
| K. Reese
|
| 1,507
| 2-2
| 
|- bgcolor=#ffbbbb
| 5
| 17 November
| @ 
| 4–9
| A. Claggett
| H. Koishi
| 
| 1,619
| 2-3
| 
|- bgcolor=#bbffbb
| 6
| 18 November
| @ 
| 12–2
| S. Gibbons
| S. Mitchinson
| 
| 1,189
| 3-3
| 
|- bgcolor=#bbffbb
| 7
| 23 November
| @ 
| 5–3
| Z. Arneson
| D. Loggins
| J. Hussey
| 1,155
| 4-3
| 
|- bgcolor=#ffbbbb
| 8
| 24 November (DH 1)
| @ 
| 9–10
| K. Perkins
| H. Koishi
| S. Tole
| 
| 4-4
| 
|- bgcolor=#ffbbbb
| 9
| 24 November (DH 2)
| @ 
| 3–5
| M. Fujihara
| D. McGrath
| D. Loggins
| 1,503
| 4-5
| 
|- bgcolor=#bbffbb
| 10
| 25 November
| @ 
| 8–7
| A. Blackley
| J. Holdzkom
| J. Hussey
| 980
| 5-5
| 
|- bgcolor=#ffbbbb
| 11
| 30 November
| 
| 2-9
| V. Vasquez
| K. Reese
| 
| 584
| 5-6
| 
|-

|- bgcolor=#bbffbb
| 12
| 1 December (DH 1)
| 
| 3–1
| H. Koishi
| S. Mitchinson
| J. Hussey
| 
| 6-6
| 
|- bgcolor=#ffbbbb
| 13
| 1 December (DH 2)
| 
| 0–8
| A. Claggett
| S. Gibbons
| 
| 1,135
| 6-7
| 
|- bgcolor=#ffbbbb
| 14
| 2 December
| 
| 3–4
| D. Schmidt
| A. Blackley
| C. Lamb
| 407
| 6-8
| 
|- bgcolor=#ffbbbb
| 15
| 7 December
| @ 
| 4–10
| R. Olson
| Y. Nakazaki
| 
| 936
| 6-9
| 
|- bgcolor=#ffbbbb
| 16
| 8 December (DH 1)
| @ 
| 3–5
| A. Kittredge
| A. Blackley
| 
| -
| 6-10
| 
|- bgcolor=#ffbbbb
| 17
| 8 December (DH 2)
| @ 
| 1–18
| P. Mildren
| S. Gibbons
| 
| 1,504 
| 6-11
| 
|- bgcolor=#ffbbbb
| 18
| 9 December
| @ 
| 8–9
| R. Olson
| Z. Arneson
| 
| 545
| 6-12
| 
|- bgcolor=#ffbbbb
| 19
| 13 December
| 
| 1–9
| B. Grening
| K. Reese
| 
| 632
| 6-13 
| 
|- bgcolor=#bbffbb
| 20
| 14 December (DH 1)
| 
| 5–0
| H. Koishi
| R. Dickmann
| 
| 
| 7-13
| 
|- bgcolor=#ffbbbb
| 21
| 14 December (DH 2)
| 
| 8–9
| S. Toler
| Y. Nakazaki
| 
| 1,136
| 7-14
| 
|- bgcolor=#ffbbbb
| 22
| 15 December
| 
| 0–5
| J. Holdzkom
| S. Gibbons
| 
| 223
| 7-15
| 
|- bgcolor=#ffbbbb
| 23
| 20 December
| 
| 1–5
| C. Anderson
| K. Reese
| 
| 334
| 7-16
| 
|- bgcolor=#bbffbb
| 24
| 21 December
| 
| 1–0
| H. Koishi
| C. Oxspring
| C. Forbes
| 234
| 8-16
| 
|- bgcolor=#ffbbbb
| 25
| 22 December
| 
| 3–4
| T. Herr
| A. Blackley
| M. Williams
| 424
| 8-17
| 
|- bgcolor=#ffbbbb
| 26
| 23 December
| 
| 8–10
| T. Herr
| C. Forbes
| M. Williams
| 270
| 8-18
| 
|- bgcolor=#ffbbbb
| 27
| 27 December
| @ 
| 1–5
| C. Lofgren
| J. Hussey
| 
| 569
| 8-19
| 
|- bgcolor=#ffbbbb
| 28
| 28 December
| @ 
| 0–4
| C. Smith
| K. Reese
| 
| 614
| 8-20
| 
|- bgcolor=#bbffbb
| 29
| 29 December
| @ 
| 5–3
| C. Forbes
| K. Maso
| 
| 2,056
| 9-20
| 
|- bgcolor=#ffbbbb
| 30
| 30 December
| @ 
| 1–6
| J. Schult
| J. Kennedy
| 
| 644
| 9-21
| 
|-

|- bgcolor=#bbffbb
| 31
| 3 January
| 
| 6–1
| K. Reese
| C. Lofgren
| 
| 586
| 10-21
| 
|- bgcolor=#bbffbb
| 32
| 4 January
| 
| 7–3
| J. Hussey
| T. Tetsuya
| C. Forbes
| 421
| 11-21
| 
|- bgcolor=#bbffbb
| 33
| 5 January
| 
| 2–0
| A. Bright
| R. Searle
| Z. Arneson
| 902
| 12-21
| 
|- bgcolor=#bbffbb
| 34
| 6 January
| 
| 5–4
| M. Hodge
| N. Crawford
| 
| 621
| 13-21
| 
|- bgcolor=#ffbbbb
| 35
| 10 January
| @ 
| 3–13
| C. Oxspring
| M. Hodge
| 
| 912
| 13-22
| 
|- bgcolor=#ffbbbb
| 36
| 11 January
| @ 
| 0–2
| C. Anderson
| J. Hussey
| M. Williams
| 1,274
| 13-23
| 
|- bgcolor=#ffbbbb
| 37
| 12 January
| @ 
| 4–5
| B. Thomas
| A. Bright
| M. Williams
| 1,570
| 13-24
| 
|- bgcolor=#ffbbbb
| 38
| 13 January
| @ 
| 1–4
| T. Atherton
| A. Blackley
| M. Williams
| 1,008
| 13-25
| 
|- bgcolor=#bbffbb
| 39
| 17 January
| 
| 3–2
| J. Hussey
| Z. Fuesser
| T. Blackley
| 764
| 14-25
| 
|- bgcolor=#bbffbb
| 40
| 18 January
| 
| 8–2
| K. Reese
| S. Kim
| 
| 1,143
| 15-25
| 
|- bgcolor=#ffbbbb
| 41
| 19 January
| 
| 6–12
| R. Olson
| A. Bright
| 
| 1,411
| 15-26
| 
|- bgcolor=#ffbbbb
| 42
| 20 January
| 
| 0–9
| D. Ruzic
| A. Blackley
| 
| 1,144
| 15-27
| 
|- bgcolor=#ffbbbb
| 43
| 24 January
| @ 
| 3–4
| B. Wise
| Z. Arneson
| 
| 1,447
| 15-28
| 
|- bgcolor=#ffbbbb
| 44
| 25 January
| @ 
| 3–11
| W. Saupold
| K. Reese
| 
| 2,073
| 15-29
| 
|- bgcolor=#ffbbbb
| 45
| 26 January
| @ 
| 2–6
| D. Schmidt
| J. Kennedy
| 
| 1,303
| 15-30
| 
|- bgcolor=#ffbbbb
| 46
| 27 January
| @ 
| 1–11
| J. Frawley
| B. Cunningham
| 
| 1,893
| 15-31
| 
|-

Roster

References 

Melbourne Aces
Melbourne Aces